Woodin Creek, also known as Weaver Creek, is one of five main tributaries of  Salmon Creek located in Clark County, Washington. The headwaters of Woodin Creek are a spring near Battle Ground Lake State Park and flow southwest through the city of Battle Ground before turning south to empty into Salmon Creek near the SR 503 bridge.

Watershed
The Woodin Creek Watershed is a sub-unit of the Salmon Creek Watershed and is further divided by the city of Battle Ground at the county level for the purposes of Clark County restoration efforts and environmental impact studies. The watershed above Battle Ground, consists of mainly wooded residential lots whereas below Battle Ground, the watershed is populated largely by rural homes on large lots. Overall, the Woodin Creek drainage area is about one-third forest, one-third grass fields and shrubs, and one-third urban. Stream monitoring by Clark County Environmental Services shows that Woodin Creek is in poor health below Battle Ground. Above Battle Ground, where the drainage area is forested, the stream may be in better condition. Much of the creek, from Battle Ground to Salmon Creek, lacks stream-side trees to provide shade and habitat. According to Clark County studies, it is likely that Woodin Creek will remain in poor condition or degrade further as urban development of the Battle Ground area continues. Current restoration and management strategies for Woodin Creek include finding and removing bacteria sources, adding streamside trees, minimizing runoff from development projects, retaining forests and reforesting unused fields and pastures.

Etymology
Woodin Creek, was initially named Mud Creek by the earliest pioneers in Battle Ground, was renamed for Joseph (Wooden Joe) Woodin. Woodin was a mail carrier in the pioneer days of Battle Ground. The stream arose from a spring located on the land he settled.  Then sold to Rudoph Gustav Ebert, passed to his son, George Peter Ebert, passed to his son Clarence Ryan Ebert, and then his son Rudolph Joe Ebert (current holder 2015) Source:  Sandra Jean Ebert Ruff (daughter of Clarence Ryan Ebert)

References

Rivers of Washington (state)
Rivers of Clark County, Washington